Andreas Haider-Maurer was the defending champion, but lost in the quarterfinals to Adam Pavlásek.
David Goffin won the title, beating Blaž Rola in the final, 6–4, 6–2.

Seeds

  Blaž Rola (final)
  Andreas Haider-Maurer (quarterfinals)
  David Goffin (champion)
  João Souza (semifinals)
  Damir Džumhur (first round)
  Andreas Beck (first round)
  Pierre-Hugues Herbert (first round)
  Adrian Ungur (quarterfinals)

Draw

Finals

Top half

Bottom half

External Links
 Main Draw
 Qualifying Draw

Poznan Open - Singles
2014 Singles